Diamond Cartel is an adventure film directed by Salamat Mukhammed-Ali and written by Magamet Bachaev, Dauren Mussa and Salamat Mukhammed-Ali. The film is also known by the title The Whole World at Our Feet. The film was released in 2015.  The film is available on Netflix streaming as of October, 2017.

The film stars or has on-screen appearances by Armand Assante, Peter O'Toole, Bolo Yeung, Cary-Hiroyuki Tagawa and  Don "The Dragon" Wilson.

Cast
 Armand Assante as Mussa
 Karlygash Mukhamedzhanova as Aliya
 Alexey Frandetti as Ruslan
 Nurlan Altayev as Arman
 Cary-Hiroyuki Tagawa as Khazar
 Serik Bimurzin as "Catastrophe"
 Murat Bissenbin as "Cube"
 Peter O'Toole as "Tugboat"
 Michael Madsen as Mike
 Tommy Lister as Louie
 Don 'The Dragon' Wilson as Mr. Lo
 Oliver Gruner as Tony
 Arsen Dzhambulov as Bakha "Slick"
 Olga Elmanova as Olga
 Asan Mazhit as Sorrel
 Bolo Yeung as Bulo

References 

2017 films
English-language Kazakhstani films
2010s action adventure films